Greenwood County is a county located in the U.S. state of South Carolina. As of the 2020 census, its population was 69,351. Its county seat is Greenwood.

Among the 22 counties located in the Piedmont of the state, Greenwood County is coterminous with the Greenwood, SC, Micropolitan Statistical Area.

History
In the colonial years, English and Scots traders from Charles Town (later known as Charleston) were the first Europeans to make regular forays into this back country, part of the traditional territory of the Cherokee Nation, which had numerous towns on the upper tributaries of the Savannah River, especially along the Keowee River. Their territory extended into modern western North Carolina, eastern Tennessee and northeastern Georgia. The traders called this route in South Carolina the "Cherokee Path."

The trade in deerskins was highly lucrative, and traders passed on information among them about landmarks and the distances to their customers in the Nation. They estimated mileage between streams based on their day's travel. They noted unusual aspects, such as the six creeks that ran unexpectedly south away from the Saluda River and, further west, nine creeks that ran south away from the Savannah River, noting them on maps as "6" and "9". A town in this area and a district both became known as "Ninety-Six", which historian David P. George believes is related to traders' references to these two landmark groups of streams. Using historical accounts and USGS maps, he and other historians have traced the Cherokee Path across present-day Greenwood County, territory that at the time was part of other districts.

After the Cherokee were removed from the area through treaty cessions and Indian Removal, European Americans moved in, developing large cotton plantations that were dependent on the labor of enslaved Africans. This upland region of the Piedmont supported widespread cultivation of short-staple cotton, a variety made profitable by the late 18th-century invention of the cotton gin for processing it. Cotton was the chief commodity of the South before the Civil War, and was important afterward as well. The construction of the Charlotte and South Carolina Railroad in 1852 in this area enabled planters to more easily get their products to market.

The railway also stimulated the development of textile manufacturing in the Piedmont in the late nineteenth century. Previously most cotton had been shipped to the North (New York and New England) for processing and manufacture, or to England and Europe. The rise of textile manufacturing in the South altered the economy and society of the region. The first cotton mill in Greenwood opened in 1890 with 75 workers. (As labor was highly segregated, factory owners hired only white workers for decades.) When the mill nearly failed in 1908, James C. Self became president of Greenwood Cotton Mill and built one of the largest privately held companies in the industry. Abney Mills, based in Greenwood, developed more production plants across the upstate.

Greenwood County was formed in 1897 from portions of Abbeville and Edgefield counties, which had originally been part of the old Ninety-Six District. It was named for its county seat, Greenwood. The town was named around 1824 after a cotton plantation owned by John McGehee, an early resident. The county and region has continued to be agricultural in the 21st century, although crops have changed.

In the late nineteenth century, conservative white Democrats had continued efforts to suppress black voting, through fraud and violence. Beginning with Mississippi in 1890, state legislatures passed new constitutions and laws that essentially disenfranchised most blacks. They maintained this political exclusion for decades, weakening the Republican Party throughout the South, where it had chiefly attracted freedmen and their descendants.  South Carolina passed such a constitution in 1895 but violence continued around elections as African Americans tried to vote for Republican candidates. White Democrats were determined to regain power after a fusionist ticket had been elected at the state level.

In November 1898 the Phoenix Election riot broke out, after an armed altercation at the polling place. The Republican Congressional candidate was Rhett R. Tolbert. He came from a major planter family in the area. His brother Thomas P. Jr, was collecting affidavits in Phoenix from African Americans who wanted to vote for Tolbert but had been prevented from doing so. Democrat Giels O. Ethridge, came from a polling place two miles away and confronted him. Ethridge was fatally shot; blacks were accused of killing him. White Democrats attacked Republican Thomas Tolbert and African Americans with him, wounding them seriously. (Tolbert later said that Ethridge was shot by his own people.) John R. Tolbert, their father, was also wounded, and he and another son Joseph fled to Charleston, where the senior Tolbert was US customs officer of the port. Violence took place throughout the Phoenix area for four days, with armed groups of whites coming from around the county to hunt down black suspects. A mob of 600-1000 armed white men had gathered in Phoenix before events ended. Several African-American men were killed; at least six were lynched near Rehoboth Church. An inquest concluded their deaths were from "persons unknown."

This region continued to depend on agriculture, which was struggling. Cotton crops throughout the South were damaged by the boll weevil. Many African Americans left this and other rural counties in the early 20th century in the Great Migration from 1910 to 1940, to escape Jim Crow suppression and violence, and gain jobs in industrial cities of the North and Midwest.

The Great Depression of the 1930s altered the economy and landscape of Greenwood County. Farmers were impoverished, and land values declined. As local textile mills struggled to survive, they resisted union efforts to organize the workers. After 1933, New Deal programs of the Franklin D. Roosevelt administration offered limited work relief for the unemployed, as the federal government invested in numerous local infrastructure programs to provide jobs and build for the future.

The largest New Deal project in the area was construction of Buzzard's Roost Dam on the Saluda River to impound Lake Greenwood and generate electricity at a county-owned power plant. Since then, the county sold the hydroelectric plant to Duke Power Company, which dominates the regional market. The lake offers residents and visitors an array of recreational facilities.

Since 1950, Greenwood County has developed a diversified industrial base. New factories have been constructed by such major corporations as Monsanto (Ascend), Velux, Capsugel (Lonza) and Fujifilm.

Geography

Greenwood County is in the basins of the Savannah and the Saluda rivers.

National protected areas/sites
 Cedar Springs Historic District
 Ninety Six National Historic Site
 Sumter National Forest (part)

State and local protected areas 
 Lake Greenwood State Park
 Long Cane Scenic Area

Major water bodies 
 Halfway Swamp Creek
 Lake Greenwood
 Saluda River

Adjacent counties 
 Laurens County - north
 Newberry County - northeast
 Edgefield County - southeast
 Saluda County - southeast
 McCormick County - southwest
 Abbeville County - west

Transportation

Major highways

 
  (Greenwood)
  (Ware Shoals)

Airport
 Greenwood County Airport

Demographics

2020 census

As of the 2020 United States census, there were 69,351 people, 28,544 households, and 17,855 families residing in the county.

2010 census
As of the 2010 United States Census, there were 69,661 people, 27,547 households, and 18,438 families living in the county. The racial makeup of the county was 62.9% white, 31.4% black or African American, 0.8% Asian, 0.3% American Indian, 3.5% from other races, and 1.2% from two or more races. Those of Hispanic or Latino origin made up 5.4% of the population. In terms of ancestry, 31.4% were of African descent, 17.8% identified as American, 8.7% as of English descent, 8.2% as ethnic Irish, and 8.0% as  German.

Of the 27,547 households, 32.9% had children under the age of 18 living with them, 44.4% were married couples living together, 17.5% had a female householder with no husband present, 33.1% were non-families, and 27.9% of all households were made up of individuals. The average household size was 2.43 and the average family size was 2.96. The median age was 37.9 years.

The median income for a household in the county was $38,797 and the median income for a family was $49,785. Males had a median income of $36,806 versus $29,327 for females. The per capita income for the county was $21,728. About 12.8% of families and 17.6% of the population were below the poverty line, including 27.3% of those under age 18 and 9.7% of those age 65 or over.

2000 census
As of the census of 2000, there were 66,271 people, 25,729 households, and 17,753 families living in the county.  The population density was 146 people per square mile (56/km2).  There were 28,243 housing units at an average density of 62 per square mile (24/km2).  The racial makeup of the county was 65.57% White, 31.74% Black or African American, 0.18% Native American, 0.71% Asian, 0.04% Pacific Islander, 1.03% from other races, and 0.74% from two or more races.  2.87% of the population were Hispanic or Latino of any race.

There were 25,729 households, out of which 31.70% had children under the age of 18 living with them, 48.70% were married couples living together, 16.10% had a female householder with no husband present, and 31.00% were non-families. 26.30% of all households were made up of individuals, and 10.60% had someone living alone who was 65 years of age or older.  The average household size was 2.49 and the average family size was 3.00.

In the county, the population was spread out, with 25.50% under the age of 18, 10.40% from 18 to 24, 28.20% from 25 to 44, 22.20% from 45 to 64, and 13.70% who were 65 years of age or older.  The median age was 35 years. For every 100 females there were 88.40 males.  For every 100 females age 18 and over, there were 84.60 males.

The median income for a household in the county was $34,702, and the median income for a family was $42,022. Males had a median income of $30,759 versus $23,820 for females. The per capita income for the county was $17,446.  About 9.90% of families and 14.20% of the population were below the poverty line, including 17.70% of those under age 18 and 14.10% of those age 65 or over.

Government and politics
Leath Correctional Institution, a South Carolina Department of Corrections prison for women, is located in unincorporated Greenwood County, near Greenwood.

Economy 
Greenwood County has developed a modern and diverse economic base. Fujifilm has its North American headquarters here for research and development, plus manufacturing and distribution. The Greenwood Genetic Center conducts nationally recognized genetics research. Approximately 26% of the local workforce is dedicated to manufacturing.

In 2015, the median household income in Greenwood County, SC was $37,060, a 2.82% increase from the previous year. Also in 2015, 28,506 residents in Greenwood County, SC were employed, a 1.03% growth over 2014. The most common employment sectors for residents of Greenwood County are Manufacturing, Healthcare & Social Assistance, and Retail trade.

The overall cost of living index in Greenwood County, SC, is 83, which is 13% lower than the South Carolina average and 17% lower than the national average. The cost of living index is created from the following categories: goods/services (33%), groceries (13%), health care (5%), housing (30%), transportation (9%) and utilities (10%). The cost of everyday goods and services can be a good indicator of the general cost of goods in a given city. In this case, the cost of such goods and services in Greenwood is 7% lower than the South Carolina average and 6% lower than the national average.

Major employers in Greenwood County include Self Regional Healthcare, Greenwood County School Districts, Eaton Corporation, FujiFilm Manufacturing, U.S.A.; Carolina Pride, Capsugel, Lander University, Piedmont Technical College, Cardinal Health, Ascend Performance Materials, and VELUX.

Major existing industry clusters include Life Sciences, Food Processing, Advance Materials, and Wood Products.

The per capita personal income in Greenwood County, SC as of 2015 was $33,723. The Unemployment rate in Greenwood County, SC was 4.0% as of Sept 2017. The median household income in Greenwood County was $42,240 as of 2015.

Education
Greenwood County has three school districts: Greenwood School District 50 (Greenwood Metro), Greenwood School District 51 (Ware Shoals), and Greenwood School District 52 (Ninety Six).

School districts
 Greenwood School District 50 serves families in the Greenwood metro area. This school system consists of 8 elementary schools, 3 middle schools, 2 high schools, a career center, and an adult education center. The current superintendent of District 50 is Dr. Steve Glenn.
 Greenwood School District 51 serves families in the town of Ware Shoals, as well as students from surrounding areas of Greenwood, Abbeville, and Laurens counties. Two of the three schools are located in the town limits of Ware Shoals (Greenwood County) while the other school is located in Laurens County.
 Greenwood School District 52 serves families in the town of Ninety Six and surrounding areas of Greenwood County.

Elementary schools
 Hodges Elementary School (K-5)
 Lakeview Elementary School(K4-5)
 Mathews Elementary School (K4-5)
 Merrywood Elementary School (K4-5)
 Ninety Six Elementary School (3-5)
 Ninety Six Primary School (K4-2)
 Pinecrest Elementary School (K4-5)
 Rice Elementary School (K4-5)
 Benjamin E. Mays Elementary School (K4-5)
 Ware Shoals Elementary School (4-6)
 Ware Shoals Primary School (PreK-3)
 Woodfields Elementary School (K4-5)

Middle schools
 Brewer Middle School (6-8)
 Edgewood Middle School (6-8)
 Northside Middle School (6-8)
 Westview Middle School (6-8)

High schools
 Emerald High School (9-12)
 Greenwood High School (9-12)
 Ninety Six High School (9-12)
 Ware Shoals High School (7-12)

Higher education
 Lander University (4-Year State Supported Liberal Arts University)
 Piedmont Technical College

Alternate education centers
 G. Frank Russell Technology Center (9-12)
 Genesis Education Center (7-12) and Adult Education

Communities

City
 Greenwood (county seat and largest city)

Towns
 Hodges
 Ninety Six
 Troy
 Ware Shoals (partly in Abbeville and Laurens Counties)

Census-designated places
Some communities in the county are census designated places.
 Bradley - the intersection of U.S. Highway 221 and S.C. Highway 10
 Cokesbury - the intersection of S.C. Highway 254, S.C. Highway 702, and U.S. Highway 25
 Coronaca - the intersection of S.C. Highway 702 and U.S. Highway 221
 Promised Land - along S.C. Highway 10 near the Abbeville County Line

Unincorporated communities
Some communities in the county are unincorporated.
 Callison - the intersection of S.C. Highway 67 and Phoenix Road
 Epworth - the intersection of U.S. Highway 178 and S.C. Highway 248
 Kirksey - the intersection of U.S. Highway 25 and Martin Town Road
 Phoenix - the intersection of Phoenix Road and Damascus Church Road
 Pittsburg
 Shoals Junction - U.S. Highway 178 and the Abbeville County Line
 Verdery - along S.C. Highway 10 at Cedar Springs Road

Townships
In the past, Greenwood County was partitioned into townships, including the townships of Bradley (including Bradley town), Brooks, Callison, Cokesbury (including Cokesbury town), Coronaca (including Coronaca town), Fellowship, Greenwood (with three partitions in the 1900 census – Greenwood east of the Columbia and Greenville Railroad, Greenwood west of the railroad, and Greenwood town), Hodges (including Hodges town), Kinards, Kirksey, Ninety Six (including Ninety Six town), Phoenix, Troy (including Troy town), Verdery (including Verdery town), Walnut Grove and Yeldell. Their former names and boundaries were used for United States census counting purposes and census documentation through 1960, after which Census Counting Divisions (CCDs) were used.

See also
 List of counties in South Carolina
 National Register of Historic Places listings in Greenwood County, South Carolina
 South Carolina State Parks
 List of national forests of the United States
 National Historic Site

References

External links

 
 

 
1897 establishments in South Carolina
Populated places established in 1897